The Fabelmans (Original Motion Picture Soundtrack) is the score album to the 2022 film of the same name, directed by Steven Spielberg. The musical score is composed and conducted by John Williams, in his 31st film collaboration with Spielberg and the 50th anniversary of their first film, and also, Williams' last film he would score (along with Indiana Jones and the Dial of Destiny) before retirement. The film's soundtrack was released digitally by Sony Classical on November 11, 2022 and was released on physical CD on December 9, 2022.

Production
Recording of the score began in March 2022, following Williams’s concert performance with the Vienna Philharmonic at Vienna's Musikverein. In July, stills from the recording sessions were revealed by one of the film's crew members, revealing that scoring of the film is underway. Along with his usual orchestral style, Williams opted for a score mostly relying on piano, with Joanne Pearce Martin, principal pianist of the Los Angeles Philharmonic, providing the piano solos. The film also features source classical music selected by Spielberg himself, some of which are performed on piano in the film by Mitzi Fabelman (Michelle Williams), from composers such as Friedrich Kuhlau, Muzio Clementi, Johann Sebastian Bach and Joseph Haydn.

Reception

Critical response

The score by John Williams received acclaim from critics, with some calling it "one of his best scores". Leah Greenblatt of Entertainment Weekly called it a "lofty, glimmering score". Jericho Tadeo of MovieWeb wrote: "John Williams' score, yet another with an established working relationship with Spielberg, is the musical heartbeat of The Fabelmans, at once grand and whispering when the moment calls for it." Apart from complimenting Williams' score, Deadline Hollywood writer Pete Hammond praised the use of pop songs of the time like "Walk On By" and "Goodbye Cruel World" that "really takes us right back there with Spielberg himself". Ross Bonaime called it "naturally moving". J. Don Birnam of Below The Line wrote that John Williams "offers up another fresh score that merges seamlessly into the proceedings". JoBlo.com said: "John Williams contributes a sparse score, with much of the film scored by Mitzi’s piano playing." Reuben Baron of Looper called Williams' score "great".

Music critic Jonathan Broxton, wrote "The Fabelmans is, at its core, an intimate portrait of a 50-year friendship, filled with the quiet dignity that befits what is, basically, two old men looking back on the personal and professional life they have shared. There’s a sense of finality here, a coda to a life that has included heroic marches and moments of soaring triumph, epic battles, passionate romantic love, and deep, powerful emotions, but which is now about winding down, looking back at all the things that led them to this moment in time, and smiling in quiet satisfaction."

Industry response
With The Fablemans' strong critical response at the Toronto International Film Festival premiere, possibilities of nominations in major ceremonies were highlighted by media and industry, with Williams getting the final nomination for Best Original Score at the 95th Academy Awards being possible. GoldDerby predicted that Williams' score is considered as the leading contender for that category, while also predicting the possibilites of a win. IndieWire reported that Williams' score will be shortlisted as the eligiblity requirement for a score that consisted of pre-existing recorded material was lowered down to 35 percent. The film's score album included classical pieces from several composers in the 1950s and 1960s. This rule would benefit the possible nomination of the film's score. Variety also considered Williams' score as one of the strong contenders for Best Original Score at the 80th Golden Globe Awards.

Track listing

Additional music
Songs of the film's time period that are included in the film, but are not included on the soundtrack include "Walk On By" by Dionne Warwick, "Gymnopédie n°2" by Eric Satie, "Goodbye Cruel World" by James Darren, the latter being used to accompany the montage sequence where Sammy Fabelman (Gabriel LaBelle) documents his high school's Ditch Day on film.

Credits
Credits adapted from CD liner notes.

 John Williams  composer, producer, conductor
 Ramiro Belgardt  producer, music editor
 Shawn Murphy  recording, mixing
 Joanne Pearce Martin  piano solos

Release history

References 

2022 soundtrack albums
John Williams soundtracks
Sony Classical Records soundtracks
2020s film soundtrack albums